Good Luck is the sixth extended play by South Korean boy group Beast. It was released on June 16, 2014 by Cube Entertainment.

Track listing

Chart performance

References

External links 
 Album website
 
 

Cube Entertainment EPs
2014 EPs
Dance-pop EPs
Highlight (band) EPs
Korean-language EPs